Agnès Jaoui (born 19 October 1964) is a French actress, screenwriter, film director and singer.

Jaoui has won six César Awards, three Lumières Awards, and a Best Screenplay Award at the Cannes Film Festival. She has received numerous other awards and nominations, including a nomination for Academy Award for Best Foreign Language Film.

Life and career
Jaoui was born in Antony, Hauts-de-Seine, and is of Tunisian Jewish descent. She is the daughter of Hubert Jaoui and Gyza Jaoui, who are both writers. They moved to Paris when she was 8 years old. She started theatre when she was in high school at the Lycée Henri-IV in Paris. She entered the Cours Florent when she was 15. Patrice Chéreau, director of the Théâtre des Amandiers in Nanterre where she began attending drama classes in 1984, gave her a role in the film Hôtel de France in 1987. That same year, she appeared in Harold Pinter's L'anniversaire with Jean-Pierre Bacri, who later became a faithful colleague and companion.

Jaoui and Bacri wrote the play Cuisine et dépendances, which was adapted onscreen in 1992 by Philippe Muyl. In 1993, director Alain Resnais asked them to write an adaptation of Alan Ayckbourn's 8-part play Intimate Exchanges, which became the 2-part film Smoking/No Smoking. This ironic diptych about free will and destiny won the César Award for Best Writing in 1994. In 1996, they came to know greater success with Cédric Klapisch's adaptation of their play Family Resemblances (Un air de famille), which showed their ability to observe and depict everyday life, and to criticize the social norms through bitter and corrosive humor. Once again, they won the César Award for Best Writing in 1997 and the same year collaborated again with Resnais on Same Old Song (On connaît la chanson), which they wrote but also interpreted: together, they won their third César Award for Best Writing, and Jaoui her first César Award for Best Supporting Actress.

Jaoui directed her first feature film, The Taste of Others (Le Goût des autres, 2000, written with Bacri), which questions social-cultural identities. The film was a huge success in France and attracted 4 million spectators. It also won 4 César Awards in 2001 including Best Film and Best Writing, and was nominated for the Academy Award for Best Foreign Language Film. In 2004, Jaoui's second film as a director, Look at Me (Comme une image), co-written with Bacri, was selected for the Cannes Festival and won the prize for Best Screenplay. She starred in the last Richard Dembo's film, La maison de Nina (2005) and then focused on music and released her album of Latin songs, Canta (2006). She returned to cinema in 2008 with Let's Talk About the Rain (Parlez-moi de la pluie), with French humorist Jamel Debbouze in a different role from what he was used to.

In 2012, Jaoui directed her latest film to date, Under the Rainbow (Au bout du conte), also co-written with Bacri. She revisits several fairy tales such as Cinderella, Snow White, and Little Red Riding Hood. It received acclaim from critics and audiences for originality and humor in the writing and dialogue.

Music
Jaoui studied music in the conservatoire when she was 17, but did not start her career as a singer until 2006 when her first album Canta was released. It mixed several Latin music genres (such as flamenco, bolero, and bossa) and she sang exclusively in Spanish and Portuguese. In 2007, it won the Victoire de la Musique award for "best traditional music album".

Jaoui's second album, Dans Mon Pays, was released in 2009. It also featured Latin sonorities and songs sang in Spanish and Portuguese, except for two songs in French.

Personal life

Jaoui is the daughter of Gyza Jaoui; a pioneering figure of transactional analysis, a form of psychotherapy initiated by Eric Berne. Jaoui has a brother, who is also a screenwriter and a director.

Jaoui was in a relationship with Jean-Pierre Bacri from 1987 to 2012. After their breakup, the two stayed on good terms and continued to work together.

She adopted two children from Brazil in 2012.

Filmography

As actress

As filmmaker

Discography

Awards and nominations

References

External links

 Agnès Jaoui Biography
Film Comment interviews Agnes Jaoui (Podcast)

1964 births
Living people
20th-century French actresses
21st-century French actresses
Cours Florent alumni
Best Supporting Actress César Award winners
Best Director Lumières Award winners
European Film Award for Best Screenwriter winners
French women singers
French film actresses
French people of Tunisian-Jewish descent
20th-century French screenwriters
French stage actresses
French women film directors
French women screenwriters
Jewish French actresses
20th-century French women writers
21st-century French screenwriters
21st-century French women writers
Cannes Film Festival Award for Best Screenplay winners